Vasanthi Stanley (8 May 1962 – 27 April 2019) was an Indian politician, journalist and writer. She was member of the Parliament of India representing Tamil Nadu in the Rajya Sabha, the upper house of the Indian Parliament from the Dravida Munnetra Kazhagam party. She died in a Chennai hospital after a brief illness on 27 April 2019, just 12 days before her 57th birthday.

References

External links
 Profile on Rajya Sabha website

1962 births
2019 deaths
Journalists from Tamil Nadu
Rajya Sabha members from Tamil Nadu
People from Sivaganga district
Women in Tamil Nadu politics
Indian women journalists
21st-century Indian women politicians
21st-century Indian politicians
Women writers from Tamil Nadu
Women members of the Rajya Sabha